Lysophospholipid acyltransferase 7 also known as membrane-bound O-acyltransferase domain-containing protein 7 (MBOAT7) is an enzyme that in humans is encoded by the MBOAT7 gene.
It is homologous to other membrane-bound O-acyltransferases.

Function

This gene encodes a member of the membrane-bound O-acyltransferases family of integral membrane proteins that have acyltransferase activity. The encoded protein is a lysophosphatidylinositol acyltransferase that has specificity for arachidonoyl-CoA as an acyl donor. This protein is involved in the re-acylation of phospholipids as part of the phospholipid remodeling pathway known as the Land cycle.

References

Further reading